This is a list of  vertical search engines focusing on business and financial content.

Defunct Business Search Engines 
Business.com

References

External links 
 IFACnet
 Lexis Nexis

Domain-specific search engines
Information retrieval systems